Yenikent (former Gürzüfeth or Gürsüfet) is a belde (town) in Gerze district of Sinop Province, Turkey. Situated at  it is on Turkish state highway  which connects Sinop to Samsun. The population of Yenikent is 974 . as of 2011. The former name of the settlement refers to people who escaped from Georgia during the Russo-Turkish War (1877-1878) . The settlement was declared a seat of township in 1990. But because of emigration to cities the population of the town has since been decreased.

References  

Populated places in Sinop Province
Towns in Turkey
Gerze District